RCAR, or the Research Council for Automobile Repairs is an international body of insurance industry financed automotive research centres, whose objective is to 'reduce the human and economic costs of motor vehicle losses'. The primary activity of RCAR is concerned with the engineering aspects of collision repairs and training requirements associated with motor vehicles. RCAR was formed in 1972, although the company Folksam that was most influential in the founding of RCAR was involved in repair research activities since 1960.

Members
As of April 2022,  RCAR has 23 members spread over 19countries. They are, in order of joining:
AZT Automotive GmbH (Germany) - Member since 1972
Bilskadekomiteen (Norway) - Member since 1972
Folksam (Sweden) - Member since 1972
THATCHAM (UK) - Member since 1972
LVK (Finland) - Member since 1974
The Jiken Center (Japan) - Member since 1978
IAG Research Centre (Australia) - Member since 1981
Tech-Cor Inc. (USA) - Member since 1983
CESVIMAP (Spain) - Member since 1985
GENERALICAR (Italy) - Member since 1986
CENTRO ZARAGOZA (Spain) - Member since 1990
KTI (Germany) - Member since 1991
KART (Korea) - Member since 1994
State Farm Research (USA) - Member since 1995
CESVI Argentina (Argentina) - Member since 1996
Insurance Institute for Highway Safety (USA) - Member since 1997
CESVI Mexico (Mexico) - Member since 1998
CESVI France (France) - Member since 1999
CESVI Colombia (Colombia) - Member since 2000
MRC (Malaysia) - Member since 2004
AXA Winterthur (Switzerland) - Member since 2005
Samsung Fire & Marine Insurance, Traffic Safety Research Institute (Korea) Member since 2010
CIRI Auto Technology Institute (China) - Member since 2016

References

External links
 AZT
 Mapfre.com

Insurance industry organizations
Automotive safety